The 1985–86 NBA season was the 76ers 37th season in the NBA and 23rd season in Philadelphia. The Sixers ended the regular season with a 54-28 record. In the first round off the playoffs they would beat the Washington Bullets in five games, but then lost a tough seven game series to the Milwaukee Bucks, a team that the Sixers had beaten in the playoffs in 1981, 1982, 1983, and 1985.

This would be the last season for Bobby Jones, who would retire,  and the last season for Moses Malone in a Philadelphia uniform, who was dealt away in the Summer of 1986. Due to an eye injury sustained towards the end of the regular season, Malone did not participate in the 1986 NBA playoffs. Andrew Toney only played in six regular season games due to a foot injury and never was able to make it back to his previous all star form.

Draft picks

Roster

Regular season

Season standings

z – clinched division title
y – clinched division title
x – clinched playoff spot

Record vs. opponents

Game log

Regular season

|- align="center" bgcolor="#ccffcc"
| 1
| October 26, 1985
| @ New York
| W 99–89
|
|
|
| Madison Square Garden
| 1–0
|- align="center" bgcolor="#ffcccc"
| 2
| October 29, 1985
| @ Milwaukee
| L 117–119
|
|
|
| MECCA Arena
| 1–1
|- align="center" bgcolor="#ccffcc"
| 3
| October 30, 1985
| Detroit
| W 132–125 (OT)
|
|
|
| The Spectrum
| 2–1

|- align="center" bgcolor="#ffcccc"
| 4
| November 1, 1985
| @ New Jersey
| L 102–106
|
|
|
| Brendan Byrne Arena
| 2–2
|- align="center" bgcolor="#ffcccc"
| 5
| November 2, 19857:30p.m. EST
| @ Atlanta
| L 113–114 (OT)
| Barkley (21)
| Malone (15)
| Barkley (6)
| The Omni12,214
| 2–3
|- align="center" bgcolor="#ccffcc"
| 6
| November 6, 1985
| Indiana
| W 105–97
|
|
|
| The Spectrum
| 3–3
|- align="center" bgcolor="#ffcccc"
| 7
| November 8, 1985
| San Antonio
| L 95–107
|
|
|
| The Spectrum
| 3–4
|- align="center" bgcolor="#ccffcc"
| 8
| November 10, 1985
| Milwaukee
| W 105–97
|
|
|
| The Spectrum
| 4–4
|- align="center" bgcolor="#ccffcc"
| 9
| November 13, 1985
| Chicago
| W 110–106
|
|
|
| The Spectrum
| 5–4
|- align="center" bgcolor="#ffcccc"
| 10
| November 16, 1985
| @ Washington
| L 97–118
|
|
|
| Capital Centre
| 5–5
|- align="center" bgcolor="#ccffcc"
| 11
| November 20, 1985
| Golden State
| W 117–113
|
|
|
| The Spectrum
| 6–5
|- align="center" bgcolor="#ffcccc"
| 12
| November 22, 1985
| @ Boston
| L 103–110
|
|
|
| Boston Garden
| 6–6
|- align="center" bgcolor="#ffcccc"
| 13
| November 23, 1985
| Detroit
| L 114–119
|
|
|
| The Spectrum
| 6–7
|- align="center" bgcolor="#ffcccc"
| 14
| November 26, 1985
| Boston
| L 91–98
|
|
|
| The Spectrum
| 6–8
|- align="center" bgcolor="#ccffcc"
| 15
| November 27, 1985
| @ New Jersey
| W 111–100
|
|
|
| Brendan Byrne Arena
| 7–8
|- align="center" bgcolor="#ccffcc"
| 16
| November 29, 1985
| @ Indiana
| W 110–109
|
|
|
| Market Square Arena
| 8–8
|- align="center" bgcolor="#ccffcc"
| 17
| November 30, 1985
| @ New York
| W 115–95
|
|
|
| Madison Square Garden
| 9–8

|- align="center" bgcolor="#ccffcc"
| 18
| December 3, 1985
| @ Detroit
| W 127–107
|
|
|
| Pontiac Silverdome
| 10–8
|- align="center" bgcolor="#ccffcc"
| 19
| December 4, 1985
| Washington
| W 115–110 (OT)
|
|
|
| The Spectrum
| 11–8
|- align="center" bgcolor="#ffcccc"
| 20
| December 6, 1985
| Denver
| L 121–123
|
|
|
| The Spectrum
| 11–9
|- align="center" bgcolor="#ffcccc"
| 21
| December 8, 1985
| Seattle
| L 100–105
|
|
|
| The Spectrum
| 11–10
|- align="center" bgcolor="#ccffcc"
| 22
| December 11, 1985
| Cleveland
| W 125–110
|
|
|
| The Spectrum
| 12–10
|- align="center" bgcolor="#ffcccc"
| 23
| December 12, 1985
| @ Chicago
| L 102–106
|
|
|
| Chicago Stadium
| 12–11
|- align="center" bgcolor="#ffcccc"
| 24
| December 14, 19857:30p.m. EST
| @ Atlanta
| L 103–107
| Malone (30)
| Malone (11)
| Cheeks (5)
| The Omni4,638
| 12–12
|- align="center" bgcolor="#ccffcc"
| 25
| December 17, 1985
| @ Indiana
| W 102–96
|
|
|
| Market Square Arena
| 13–12
|- align="center" bgcolor="#ccffcc"
| 26
| December 18, 1985
| Houston
| W 126–108
|
|
|
| The Spectrum
| 14–12
|- align="center" bgcolor="#ccffcc"
| 27
| December 20, 1985
| Utah
| W 112–105
|
|
|
| The Spectrum
| 15–12
|- align="center" bgcolor="#ccffcc"
| 28
| December 21, 1985
| Boston
| W 108–102
|
|
|
| The Spectrum
| 16–12
|- align="center" bgcolor="#ccffcc"
| 29
| December 26, 1985
| @ L.A. Clippers
| W 117–108
|
|
|
| Los Angeles Memorial Sports Arena
| 17–12
|- align="center" bgcolor="#ccffcc"
| 30
| December 28, 1985
| @ Phoenix
| W 100–98
|
|
|
| Arizona Veterans Memorial Coliseum
| 18–12
|- align="center" bgcolor="#ccffcc"
| 31
| December 30, 1985
| @ Sacramento
| W 87–84
|
|
|
| ARCO Arena
| 19–12

|- align="center" bgcolor="#ccffcc"
| 32
| January 1, 1986
| @ Portland
| W 121–119 (OT)
|
|
|
| Memorial Coliseum
| 20–12
|- align="center" bgcolor="#ffcccc"
| 33
| January 4, 1986
| @ Houston
| L 100–115
|
|
|
| The Summit
| 20–13
|- align="center" bgcolor="#ccffcc"
| 34
| January 6, 1986
| @ San Antonio
| W 108–102
|
|
|
| HemisFair Arena
| 21–13
|- align="center" bgcolor="#ccffcc"
| 35
| January 8, 1986
| L.A. Clippers
| W 116–114
|
|
|
| The Spectrum
| 22–13
|- align="center" bgcolor="#ccffcc"
| 36
| January 10, 1986
| Sacramento
| W 113–102
|
|
|
| The Spectrum
| 23–13
|- align="center" bgcolor="#ccffcc"
| 37
| January 11, 1986
| @ Detroit
| W 102–101
|
|
|
| Pontiac Silverdome
| 24–13
|- align="center" bgcolor="#ccffcc"
| 38
| January 14, 1986
| @ New Jersey
| W 123–105
|
|
|
| Brendan Byrne Arena
| 25–13
|- align="center" bgcolor="#ffcccc"
| 39
| January 15, 1986
| New Jersey
| L 89–123
|
|
|
| The Spectrum
| 25–14
|- align="center" bgcolor="#ccffcc"
| 40
| January 17, 1986
| @ Chicago
| W 120–118 (OT)
|
|
|
| Chicago Stadium
| 26–14
|- align="center" bgcolor="#ccffcc"
| 41
| January 20, 1986
| New York
| W 103–93
|
|
|
| The Spectrum
| 27–14
|- align="center" bgcolor="#ccffcc"
| 42
| January 22, 1986
| Phoenix
| W 118–111
|
|
|
| The Spectrum
| 28–14
|- align="center" bgcolor="#ccffcc"
| 43
| January 24, 1986
| @ Cleveland
| W 121–114
|
|
|
| Richfield Coliseum
| 29–14
|- align="center" bgcolor="#ffcccc"
| 44
| January 26, 1986
| @ Boston
| L 103–105
|
|
|
| Boston Garden
| 29–15
|- align="center" bgcolor="#ccffcc"
| 45
| January 28, 1986
| @ Seattle
| W 106–99
|
|
|
| Seattle Center Coliseum
| 30–15
|- align="center" bgcolor="#ffcccc"
| 46
| January 29, 1986
| @ Utah
| L 86–107
|
|
|
| Salt Palace Acord Arena
| 30–16
|- align="center" bgcolor="#ffcccc"
| 47
| January 31, 1986
| @ L.A. Lakers
| L 100–134
|
|
|
| The Forum
| 30–17

|- align="center" bgcolor="#ffcccc"
| 48
| February 1, 1986
| @ Golden State
| L 121–125
|
|
|
| Oakland-Alameda County Coliseum Arena
| 30–18
|- align="center" bgcolor="#ccffcc"
| 49
| February 5, 1986
| New Jersey
| W 142–107
|
|
|
| The Spectrum
| 31–18
|- align="center" bgcolor="#ccffcc"
| 50
| February 6, 1986
| @ Cleveland
| W 111–103
|
|
|
| Richfield Coliseum
| 32–18
|- align="center"
|colspan="9" bgcolor="#bbcaff"|All-Star Break
|- style="background:#cfc;"
|- bgcolor="#bbffbb"
|- align="center" bgcolor="#ccffcc"
| 51
| February 12, 1986
| Chicago
| W 106–98
|
|
|
| The Spectrum
| 33–18
|- align="center" bgcolor="#ccffcc"
| 52
| February 13, 1986
| @ New York
| W 95–92
|
|
|
| Madison Square Garden
| 34–18
|- align="center" bgcolor="#ffcccc"
| 53
| February 15, 1986
| @ Detroit
| L 133–134 (OT)
|
|
|
| Pontiac Silverdome
| 34–19
|- align="center" bgcolor="#ffcccc"
| 54
| February 17, 1986
| Milwaukee
| L 106–111
|
|
|
| The Spectrum
| 34–20
|- align="center" bgcolor="#ccffcc"
| 55
| February 19, 1986
| Portland
| W 153–133
|
|
|
| The Spectrum
| 35–20
|- align="center" bgcolor="#ccffcc"
| 56
| February 21, 1986
| Washington
| W 97–87
|
|
|
| The Spectrum
| 36–20
|- align="center" bgcolor="#ffcccc"
| 57
| February 23, 1986
| L.A. Lakers
| L 111–117 (OT)
|
|
|
| The Spectrum
| 36–21
|- align="center" bgcolor="#ccffcc"
| 58
| February 25, 1986
| @ Chicago
| W 122–108
|
|
|
| Chicago Stadium
| 37–21
|- align="center" bgcolor="#ccffcc"
| 59
| February 28, 1986
| @ Dallas
| W 123–120
|
|
|
| Reunion Arena
| 38–21

|- align="center" bgcolor="#ccffcc"
| 60
| March 1, 1986
| @ Denver
| W 118–107
|
|
|
| McNichols Sports Arena
| 39–21
|- align="center" bgcolor="#ffcccc"
| 61
| March 4, 19867:30p.m. EST
| @ Atlanta
| L 121–128
| Malone (35)
| Barkley (16)
| Barkley, Cheeks (6)
| The Omni13,315
| 39–22
|- align="center" bgcolor="#ffcccc"
| 62
| March 5, 19867:30p.m. EST
| Atlanta
| L 114–122 (OT)
| Malone (29)
| Malone (20)
| Cheeks (8)
| The Spectrum15,192
| 39–23
|- align="center" bgcolor="#ffcccc"
| 63
| March 7, 1986
| @ Milwaukee
| L 95–125
|
|
|
| MECCA Arena
| 39–24
|- align="center" bgcolor="#ccffcc"
| 64
| March 9, 1986
| Indiana
| W 120–102
|
|
|
| The Spectrum
| 40–24
|- align="center" bgcolor="#ccffcc"
| 65
| March 11, 1986
| @ Indiana
| W 101–91
|
|
|
| Market Square Arena
| 41–24
|- align="center" bgcolor="#ccffcc"
| 66
| March 12, 1986
| New York
| W 105–95
|
|
|
| The Spectrum
| 42–24
|- align="center" bgcolor="#ccffcc"
| 67
| March 14, 1986
| Cleveland
| W 109–100
|
|
|
| The Spectrum
| 43–24
|- align="center" bgcolor="#ffcccc"
| 68
| March 16, 1986
| @ Boston
| L 101–118
|
|
|
| Boston Garden
| 43–25
|- align="center" bgcolor="#ccffcc"
| 69
| March 17, 1986
| @ Cleveland
| W 118–112 (OT)
|
|
|
| Richfield Coliseum
| 44–25
|- align="center" bgcolor="#ccffcc"
| 70
| March 19, 1986
| Chicago
| W 118–112
|
|
|
| The Spectrum
| 45–25
|- align="center" bgcolor="#ccffcc"
| 71
| March 21, 1986
| Washington
| W 112–105
|
|
|
| The Spectrum
| 46–25
|- align="center" bgcolor="#ccffcc"
| 72
| March 22, 1986
| New Jersey
| W 123–115
|
|
|
| The Spectrum
| 47–25
|- align="center" bgcolor="#ffcccc"
| 73
| March 24, 1986
| @ Washington
| L 93–100
|
|
|
| Capital Centre
| 47–26
|- align="center" bgcolor="#ccffcc"
| 74
| March 26, 19867:30p.m. EST
| Atlanta
| W 112–103
| Malone (32)
| Barkley (19)
| Cheeks (11)
| The Spectrum14,125
| 48–26
|- align="center" bgcolor="#ffcccc"
| 75
| March 28, 1986
| Milwaukee
| L 94–116
|
|
|
| The Spectrum
| 48–27
|- align="center" bgcolor="#ccffcc"
| 76
| March 30, 1986
| Dallas
| W 114–113
|
|
|
| The Spectrum
| 49–27

|- align="center" bgcolor="#ccffcc"
| 77
| April 2, 1986
| New York
| W 93–87
|
|
|
| The Spectrum
| 50–27
|- align="center" bgcolor="#ccffcc"
| 78
| April 4, 1986
| Cleveland
| W 122–102
|
|
|
| The Spectrum
| 51–27
|- align="center" bgcolor="#ccffcc"
| 79
| April 6, 1986
| Boston
| W 95–94
|
|
|
| The Spectrum
| 52–27
|- align="center" bgcolor="#ccffcc"
| 80
| April 8, 1986
| Detroit
| W 116–112
|
|
|
| The Spectrum
| 53–27
|- align="center" bgcolor="#ccffcc"
| 81
| April 11, 1986
| Indiana
| W 130–122
|
|
|
| The Spectrum
| 54–27
|- align="center" bgcolor="#ffcccc"
| 82
| April 13, 1986
| @ Washington
| L 97–98
|
|
|
| Capital Centre
| 54–28

Playoffs

|- align="center" bgcolor="#ffcccc"
| 1
| April 18, 1986
| Washington
| L 94–95
| Charles Barkley (26)
| Charles Barkley (22)
| Charles Barkley (9)
| The Spectrum9,148
| 0–1
|- align="center" bgcolor="#ccffcc"
| 2
| April 20, 1986
| Washington
| W 102–97
| Charles Barkley (27)
| Charles Barkley (20)
| Charles Barkley (6)
| The Spectrum9,057
| 1–1
|- align="center" bgcolor="#ccffcc"
| 3
| April 22, 1986
| @ Washington
| W 91–86
| Julius Erving (22)
| Charles Barkley (14)
| Julius Erving (6)
| Capital Centre17,137
| 2–1
|- align="center" bgcolor="#ffcccc"
| 4
| April 24, 1986
| @ Washington
| L 111–116
| Maurice Cheeks (30)
| Charles Barkley (15)
| Charles Barkley (7)
| Capital Centre12,588
| 2–2
|- align="center" bgcolor="#ccffcc"
| 5
| April 27, 1986
| Washington
| W 134–109
| Terry Catledge (27)
| Charles Barkley (15)
| Charles Barkley (12)
| The Spectrum15,162
| 3–2
|-

|- align="center" bgcolor="#ccffcc"
| 1
| April 29, 1986
| @ Milwaukee
| W 118–112
| Charles Barkley (31)
| Charles Barkley (20)
| Cheeks, Threatt (7)
| MECCA Arena11,052
| 1–0
|- align="center" bgcolor="#ffcccc"
| 2
| May 1, 1986
| @ Milwaukee
| L 107–119
| Charles Barkley (26)
| Charles Barkley (15)
| Maurice Cheeks (8)
| MECCA Arena11,052
| 1–1
|- align="center" bgcolor="#ccffcc"
| 3
| May 3, 1986
| Milwaukee
| W 107–103
| Charles Barkley (29)
| Charles Barkley (13)
| Maurice Cheeks (10)
| The Spectrum14,611
| 2–1
|- align="center" bgcolor="#ffcccc"
| 4
| May 5, 1986
| Milwaukee
| L 104–109
| Charles Barkley (37)
| Charles Barkley (14)
| Maurice Cheeks (10)
| The Spectrum17,941
| 2–2
|- align="center" bgcolor="#ffcccc"
| 5
| May 7, 1986
| @ Milwaukee
| L 108–113
| Charles Barkley (29)
| Clemon Johnson (9)
| Barkley, Erving (5)
| MECCA Arena11,052
| 2–3
|- align="center" bgcolor="#ccffcc"
| 6
| May 9, 1986
| Milwaukee
| W 126–108
| Jones, Barkley (23)
| Charles Barkley (21)
| Maurice Cheeks (13)
| The Spectrum15,287
| 3–3
|- align="center" bgcolor="#ffcccc"
| 7
| May 11, 1986
| @ Milwaukee
| L 112–113
| Sedale Threatt (28)
| Charles Barkley (12)
| Maurice Cheeks (6)
| MECCA Arena11,052
| 3–4
|-

Player statistics

Playoffs

Awards and records
 Charles Barkley, All-NBA Second Team
 Maurice Cheeks, NBA All-Defensive First Team

References

See also
 1985–86 NBA season

Philadelphia 76ers seasons
Phil
Philadelphia
Philadelphia